Carroll-Camden Industrial Area is a neighborhood in southwest Baltimore, Maryland.

References

Neighborhoods in Baltimore
Southwest Baltimore